The 1995 season was Molde's 20th season in the top flight of Norwegian football, the first since their promotion back to the first tier in 1994. This season Molde competed in Tippeligaen, Norwegian Cup and the 1995–96 UEFA Cup Winners' Cup.

In Tippeligaen, Molde finished in 2nd position, 15 points behind winners Rosenborg. 

Molde participated in the 1995 Norwegian Cup. They were knocked out in the fourth round by Hødd with the score 0–2.

Squad

Friendlies

Competitions

Tippeligaen

Results summary

Positions by round

Results

League table

Norwegian Cup

UEFA Cup Winners' Cup

Qualifying round

First round

Squad statistics

Appearances and goals
Appearance statistics from Norwegian Cup rounds 1–3 are incomplete.

        
  

     

|}

Goalscorers

See also
Molde FK seasons

References

External links
nifs.no

1995
Molde